The Nokia 1 is a Nokia-branded budget Android Go smartphone, developed by HMD Global. It was launched at the Mobile World Congress 2018, in Barcelona, Spain on 25 February 2018. This device, along with the Nokia 8 Sirocco, completes the lineup of Nokia-branded Android devices. The phone also has separately sold removable back covers marketed as Xpress-on, a trade-name that first appeared on the Nokia 5110. This was the first time the Xpress-on name was used since the Nokia Lumia 710 in 2012.

Specifications

Hardware
The Nokia 1 has a quad-core 1.1 GHz Cortex-A53 Mediatek MT6737M CPU with 1 GB of RAM and 8 GB of internal storage that can be expanded using a microSD card of up to 128 GB.

The device also has a 4.5-inch IPS LCD display, a 5 MP rear camera with auto-focus and an LED flash, and a 2 MP front-facing camera.

The 2150 mAh user-removable Li-Ion battery allows for up to 15 days of standby time and up to 9 hours of talk time. The smartphone's back covers are available in Warm Red, Dark Blue, and light blue colors.

Software
The Nokia 1 is shipped with Android 8.1 Oreo (Go edition), and gets continuous security updates every month for up to 3 years.

In late June 2019, HMD began rolling out the Android 9 Pie (Go edition) for Nokia 1. The Android 10 (Go edition) was rolled out to the Nokia 1.

Reception 
The Nokia 1 generally received mixed reviews. Sean Cameron of TechRadar praised the device's battery life, customisable back cover and durable design, while criticising its poor performance, dim screen and poor speaker.

References

External links
 
 https://www.nokia.com/phones/en_int/security-updates

1
Mobile phones introduced in 2018
Discontinued smartphones
Mobile phones with user-replaceable battery